Tommie is a masculine given name of English origin, occasionally a nickname or shortened form of Thomas, and is sometimes used as a feminine form of Thomas. Notable people with the name include:

Tommie Aaron (1939–1984), first baseman and left fielder in Major League Baseball
Tommie Agee (1942–2001), Major League Baseball center fielder
Tommie Agee (American football) (born 1964), former American National Football League running back
Tommie Barfield (1888–1949), the first school superintendent of Collier County, Florida
Tommie Bass (1908–1996) Appalachian herbalist who lived near Lookout Mountain, Alabama
Tommie Brown (born 1934), former representative of Chattanooga to the Tennessee state legislature
Tommie Burton (1878–1946), West Indian cricketer
Tommie Connor (1904–1993), British songwriter
Tommie Eriksson, musician who played in the symphonic metal band Therion
Tommie Frazier (born 1974), former college football quarterback
Tommie Gorman (born 1956), Irish journalist
Tommie Harris (born 1983), American National Football League defensive tackle
Tommie Hill (born 1985), American football defensive end
Tommie Lindsey (born 1951), American high school public speaking coach
Tommie Reynolds (born 1941), former Major League Baseball outfielder
Tommie Shelby, philosopher and writer
Tommie Sisk (born 1942), former right-handed Major League Baseball pitcher
Tommie Smith (born 1944), African American former track & field athlete
Tommie Sunshine, record producer, remixer, DJ and electronic music songwriter Thomas Lorello
Tommie van der Leegte (born 1977), retired Dutch footballer
Tommie Young, American soul and gospel singer from Dallas, Texas

See also 
 Tommy (disambiguation)

English masculine given names
Hypocorisms
English unisex given names

de:Tommie